Noah Knowles Davis (1830–1910) was an American educator.

Early life 
Noah Knowles Davis was born in Philadelphia, Pennsylvania, on May 15, 1830. His father Noah, who was a minister of the Baptist Tract Society, died shortly after Davis' birth. He was raised by his mother Mary (Young) Davis and step-father, the Reverend John L. Dagg, a Southern Baptist theologian.

Davis was educated at Mercer University, where his step-father was president, and in Philadelphia, Pennsylvania. He completed a BA in chemistry in 1849 as well as a PhD and LL.D.

Career 
Davis taught at Delaware College and then at Howard College (now Samford University) in 1852. Davis delivered a graduation address at Howard College in 1854.  Later he taught moral philosophy at the University of Virginia. His many books included Elements of Deductive Logic (1893), Elements of Inductive Logic (1895), and Elements of Psychology (1893). Another book was The Story of Nazarene. One of his notable works was The Theory of Thought (1880), which was based on the writings of Aristotle and covered the subject of deductive logic.

Davis also edited The Model Architect and The Carpenter's Guide.

Death and legacy 
Davis died on May 3, 1910, in Charlottesville, Virginia. Davis influenced Collins Denny, a professor of philosophy at Vanderbilt University who taught poet John Crowe Ransom.

References

External links 
 

1830 births
1910 deaths
Educators from Philadelphia
Samford University faculty
University of Virginia faculty